Hidden Valley is a private residential community in Dearborn County, Indiana, United States. For statistical purposes it is a census-designated place (CDP), with a population of 5,387 at the 2010 census, up from 4,417 at the 2000 census.

Setting
The Hidden Valley community is located in southeastern Indiana and is built around Hidden Valley Lake, an impoundment on Doublelick Run, a small stream which flows southeast to the Ohio River. The lake occupies , with recreational opportunities that include fishing, boating and water skiing. A marina is located at the southeastern tip of the lake.

History
The community and lake were built by land developer James Jacob Rupel, who was active in the Greater Dayton area and Indiana for over 50 years and the former owner of Centre City Building and the Carillon House in downtown Dayton. He was the developer of Hidden Valley Lake, several subdivisions near Rocky Fork State Park in Highland County, Ohio, the Valley Woods community in Greendale, Indiana, and the Country Squire Lakes community in North Vernon, Indiana.

Geography
Hidden Valley is located in eastern Dearborn County at  (39.166281, -84.841570), within Miller and Lawrenceburg townships. It is bordered to the south by the city of Greendale and to the east by the Ohio state line.

Demographics

As of the census of 2000, there were 4,417 people, 1,542 households, and 1,318 families residing in the CDP. The racial makeup of the CDP was 97.83% White, 0.27% African American, 0.18% Native American, 0.50% Asian, 0.07% Pacific Islander, 0.34% from other races, and 0.82% from two or more races. Hispanic or Latino of any race were 0.82% of the population.

There were 1,542 households, out of which 40.9% had children under the age of 18 living with them, 78.3% were married couples living together, 4.7% had a female householder with no husband present, and 14.5% were non-families. 10.7% of all households were made up of individuals, and 2.9% had someone living alone who was 65 years of age or older. The average household size was 2.86 and the average family size was 3.10.

In the CDP, the population was spread out, with 28.1% under the age of 18, 5.7% from 18 to 24, 31.8% from 25 to 44, 26.6% from 45 to 64, and 7.8% who were 65 years of age or older. The median age was 37 years. For every 100 females, there were 102.0 males. For every 100 females age 18 and over, there were 100.3 males.

The median income for a household in the CDP was $70,444, and the median income for a family was $72,892. Males had a median income of $46,168 versus $31,968 for females. The per capita income for the CDP was $25,464. About 2.9% of families and 2.8% of the population were below the poverty line, including 4.0% of those under age 18 and 3.1% of those age 65 or over.

Recreation
The community is home to Hidden Valley Golf Club (HVGC), a private course owned by the Hidden Valley Lake Property Owners Association that features 6,511 yards of golf from the longest tees for a par of 72. The course rating is 71.6, and it has a slope rating of 120 on rye grass. Designed by Jack Kidwell/Dr. Michael Hurdzan, ASGCA, the HVGC opened in 1974. The course borders Valley Woods, another subdivision developed by the Rupel Family.

References

External links
 

Census-designated places in Dearborn County, Indiana
Census-designated places in Indiana